Patabendige Don Albert Malcolm Ranjith (Sinhala: පටබැඳිගේ දොන් ඇල්බට් මැල්කම් රංජිත්) (born 15 November 1947), often known simply as Malcolm Ranjith or Albert Malcolm Ranjith  is a Sri Lankan prelate of the Catholic Church who has been the Archbishop of Colombo, Sri Lanka, since 2009. He was made a cardinal in 2010.

Ranjith previously served as auxiliary bishop of Colombo (1991–1995), Bishop of Ratnapura (1995–2001), Adjunct Secretary of the Congregation for the Evangelization of Peoples (2001–2004), Apostolic Nuncio to Indonesia and East Timor (2004–2005), and Secretary of the Congregation for Divine Worship and the Discipline of the Sacraments (2005–2009).

Early life and education
On 29 June 1975, Malcolm Ranjith was ordained to the priesthood by Pope Paul VI in St. Peter's Square. Later he joined the tutorial staff of St. Thomas' College, Kotte.

Episcopal career

Auxiliary Bishop of Colombo
In 1994, Ranjith led a commission that denounced the theological work of Sri Lankan theologian Tissa Balasuriya. He charged that he had questioned original sin and the divinity of Christ, as well as supporting women's ordination. Ranjith was supported by then-Cardinal Ratzinger, who backed his position.

Apostolic Nuncio to Indonesia and East Timor

Ranjith is the first Sri Lankan bishop to be appointed an Apostolic Nuncio. He was appointed titular archbishop of Umbriatico and the Apostolic Nuncio to Indonesia and to East Timor on 29 April 2004.

Secretary of the Congregation for Divine Worship
Ranjith was appointed secretary of the Congregation for Divine Worship and the Discipline of the Sacraments on 10 December 2005. 

He once said, "I'm not a fan of the Lefebvrians ... but what they sometimes say about the liturgy they say for good reason."

Ranjith is fluent in ten languages namely; Italian, French, German, Hebrew, Greek, Spanish, Latin, English, Sinhala and Tamil.

Archbishop of Colombo
On 16 June 2009, Pope Benedict XVI appointed him as Metropolitan Archbishop of Colombo, naming Joseph Di Noia to replace him at the Congregation for Divine Worship and the Discipline of the Sacraments. In a letter to Archbishop Ranjith, Pope Benedict said, "I wish to express my sincere thanks for the fidelity, the commitment and competence with which you exercised that [Divine Worship secretary] office." Pope Benedict also expressed that "we have reason to be encouraged by the good you will be able to perform among the peoples of your land."

Ranjith was among 34 metropolitan archbishops to receive his pallium from Pope Benedict on the Feast of Saints Peter and Paul on 29 June 2009. 

On 7 October 2009, Ranjith issued new liturgical guidelines in his diocese. These include a recommendation for "all faithful, including the religious, to receive Holy Communion reverently kneeling and on the tongue", as well as laymen being forbidden from preaching.

Cardinal
On 20 October 2010, Pope Benedict XVI announced he would make Ranjith a cardinal at a consistory scheduled for 20 November 2010. 

Ranjith participated as a cardinal-elector in the 2013 conclave which elected Pope Francis.

Ranjith is a member of the Congregation for Divine Worship and the Discipline of the Sacraments and of the Congregation for the Evangelization of Peoples.

References

External links

 

Living people
1947 births
20th-century Roman Catholic archbishops in Sri Lanka
Sri Lankan cardinals
21st-century Roman Catholic archbishops in Sri Lanka
21st-century Roman Catholic titular archbishops
Apostolic Nuncios to Indonesia
Apostolic Nuncios to East Timor
Members of the Congregation for Divine Worship and the Discipline of the Sacraments
Members of the Congregation for the Evangelization of Peoples
Cardinals created by Pope Benedict XVI
Pontifical Urban University alumni
Pontifical Biblical Institute alumni
Roman Catholic auxiliary bishops of Colombo
Roman Catholic archbishops of Colombo
Sri Lankan Roman Catholic archbishops